Mohan Singh (1945–2013) was an Indian politician from the Samajwadi Party..

Mohan Singh may refer to:

 General Mohan Singh (1909–1989), Indian military officer and first leader of the Indian National Army during World War II
 Mohan Singh (poet) (1905–1978), Indian poet
 Mohan Singh Oberoi (1900–2002), Indian hotelier, founder Oberoi Group